The gens Titania was an obscure plebeian family at ancient Rome.  No members of this gens are mentioned by Roman writers, but a number are known from inscriptions.

Origin
The nomen Titanius is formed using the suffix , usually indicating derivation from place names.  The root of Titanius seems to be a cognomen, Titanus; Chase classifies the nomen among those gentilicia that either originated at Rome, or cannot be shown to have come from anywhere else.

Members

 Gaius Titanius, the former master of Titania Charis, a freedwoman of Aquileia in Venetia and Histria.
 Titania C. l. Charis, a freedwoman, built a first- or second-century sepulchre at Aquileia for her husband, Sextus Teius Januarius, the freedman Quintus Catabronius Martialis, a woman named Titania Secundina, and two persons named Menandrus and Persicus.
 Titania Secundina, buried in a first- or second-century sepulchre at Aquileia, built by the freedwoman Titania Charis for her husband and several others.
 Titania Barbara, dedicated a second-century tomb at Vicus Fificulanus in Samnium for her son, Titus Opsturius Benivolus, aged twenty-seven.  She is probably the same Barbara who dedicated a second-century monument at the same place for the freedman Titus Opsturius Dasius, probably her husband.

Undated Titanii
 Sextus Titanius Cinnamus, buried at Aveia in Samnium.
 Publius Titanius Successus, built a tomb at Rome for his wife, Porcia Zosima.

See also
 List of Roman gentes

References

Bibliography
 Theodor Mommsen et alii, Corpus Inscriptionum Latinarum (The Body of Latin Inscriptions, abbreviated CIL), Berlin-Brandenburgische Akademie der Wissenschaften (1853–present).
 George Davis Chase, "The Origin of Roman Praenomina", in Harvard Studies in Classical Philology, vol. VIII, pp. 103–184 (1897).
 Giovanni Battista Brusin, Inscriptiones Aquileiae (Inscriptions of Aquileia), Udine (1991–1993).

Roman gentes